Stafford Creek is a town on North Andros Island in the Bahamas. In 2010, the town had a population of 98.

The main road in Stafford creek is off the Queen's Highway. Stafford Creek relies on fly fishing.

Stafford Creek is also the name given to a tidal creek in North Andros.  There is also a Stafford Creek on Berry Islands.

See also
 Nicholls Town
 Islands of the Bahamas
 List of rivers of the Bahamas

References

Andros, Bahamas
Populated places in the Bahamas
Rivers of the Bahamas